Chandler is a ghost town in Logan Township, Rooks County, Kansas, United States.

History
Chandler was issued a post office in 1880. The post office was discontinued in 1892.  There is nothing left of Chandler.

References

Former populated places in Rooks County, Kansas
Former populated places in Kansas
1880 establishments in Kansas
Populated places established in 1880